"Star" is a song by English synth-pop duo Erasure, released in May 1990 as the fourth European (and third American) single from the group's fourth studio album, Wild! (1989). Been described as a straightforward dance music track with disco elements, it was written by group members Vince Clarke and Andy Bell. The lyrical content clearly referencing nuclear war; Erasure's own form of protest song. When released, the track was remixed slightly for radio, bringing acoustic guitar elements and various background vocal parts forward in the mix. The accompanying music video was directed by John Maybury.

Chart performance
As the last single released from Wild!, it became Erasure's 12th consecutive top-20 hit on the UK Singles Chart, where it peaked at number 11. It also peaked at number 33 in West Germany. In the United States, the song did not enter the Billboard Hot 100, although it became a popular club hit, climbing to number four on the Billboard Hot Dance Music/Club Play chart.

Critical reception
Steven McDonald from AllMusic felt the song is "another one of those rip-roaring Clarke/Bell compositions that's as much fun for the ears as it is for the feet". He described it as "stupendous". Bill Coleman from Billboard wrote, "Pop gem that should have kicked off campaign behind sorely overlooked Wild! album is finally issued with club-ready remixes. He added, "Well-edited "Trafalmadore Mix" should satisfy house-conscious jocks." Ian McCann from NME said, "With a bassline that sounds like it has just woken up with a hangover only to find that someone has been pouring Mescal on the cornflakes, the groove of 'Star' is delicious." Jaynie Senior from Number One remarked the "pure pop" of "Star". Christopher Smith from Talk About Pop Music stated that the song "returns us to more lively, energetic Erasure as the chorus comes in first then the song gathers pace with each successive verse and chorus." Troy J. Augusto from Variety complimented it as "hook-filled".

Music video
A music video was produced to promote the single, directed by English filmmaker and artist John Maybury. It was later published on Erasure's official YouTube channel in September 2014. The video had generated more than five million views as of January 2023.

Track listings

 7-inch and cassette single (MUTE111; CMUTE111)
 "Star"
 "Dreamlike State"

 12-inch single (12MUTE111)
 "Star" (Trafalmadore mix)
 "Star" (single mix)
 "Dreamlike State" (The 12 Hour Technicolor mix)

 Limited 12-inch single (L12MUTE111)
 "Star" (Interstellar mix)
 "Star" (Soul mix)
 "Dreamlike State" (The 24 Hour Technicolor mix)

 CD single (CDMUTE111)
 "Star" (single mix)
 "Dreamlike State"
 "Star" (Trafalmadore mix)
 "Star" (Soul mix)

 US cassette single (Sire 9 19837-4)
 "Star"
 "Dreamlike State"

 US CD maxi-single (21558-2)
 "Star" (single mix)
 "Star" (Trafalmadore mix)
 "Star" (Interstellar mix)
 "Dreamlike State" (The 24 Hour Technicolor mix)
 "Star" (Soul mix)
* Also released on 12-inch vinyl (Sire 92-15580) and cassette (Sire 21558-4), minus "Star" (single mix).

Charts

References

1990 singles
1989 songs
Erasure songs
Mute Records singles
Sire Records singles
Song recordings produced by Gareth Jones
Song recordings produced by Mark Saunders
Songs written by Vince Clarke
Songs written by Andy Bell (singer)